Newton Township, Ohio may refer to several places:

Newton Township, Licking County, Ohio
Newton Township, Miami County, Ohio
Newton Township, Muskingum County, Ohio
Newton Township, Pike County, Ohio
Newton Township, Trumbull County, Ohio

Ohio township disambiguation pages